Aldershot Stadium was a greyhound racing, stock car racing and speedway stadium on Oxenden Road in Tongham, near Farnham, Surrey

Origins
The stadium was constructed on land west of the Oxenden Road and east of the Blackwater River.

Opening
Greyhound racing first took place in 1941 and the racing was independent (not affiliated to the sports governing body the National Greyhound Racing Club). It was known as a flapping track which was the nickname given to independent tracks.

Greyhound racing
During the 1950s and 1960s racing was held on Wednesday and Friday evenings at 7.30pm. The track had a circumference of 400 yards with an 'Inside Sumner' hare system and race distances of 275, 500, 675 and 900 yards. Facilities included a licensed bar, tea bar and hot dog bar and totalisator. The track was grass straights and sanded bends.

During the 1980s the facilities were listed as three stands (one glass fronted and two covered. race distances were now 254, 462, 626 and 842 metres and the main races were the Smokey Joe Stakes and the March Hare Stakes.

Speedway
Speedway took place from 1950 until 1960.

Stock Cars
During 1973 the stadium was taken over by Spedeworth International Ltd  and Stock car racing was a regular fixture.  There was also a weekly Sunday market.

Closure
The stadium closed on 30 October 1992  making way for the new A331 road. The loss of the stadium was seen as a blow to Independent racing because it was one of the more professional tracks in this type of racing.

References

Defunct greyhound racing venues in the United Kingdom
Defunct speedway venues in England
Stock car racing venues
Sport in Aldershot